Christ Episcopal Church is a historic church 210 Fifth Street SW in Puyallup, Washington.

It was built in 1926 in a Tudor Revival style and was added to the National Register in 1994.

References

Episcopal churches in Washington (state)
Churches on the National Register of Historic Places in Washington (state)
Tudor Revival architecture in Washington (state)
Churches completed in 1926
Churches in Pierce County, Washington
Puyallup, Washington
National Register of Historic Places in Pierce County, Washington